The Archaeological Association may refer to:

 The British Archaeological Association
 The Cambrian Archaeological Association
 The Canadian Archaeological Association
 The Australian Archaeological Association
 The Japanese Archaeological Association
 The Royal Historical and Archaeological Association of Ireland, a former name of the Royal Society of Antiquaries of Ireland
 The Athens Archaeological Association
 The Archaeological Association, a former name of the Grand Ducal Institute's Historical Section in Luxembourg
 Deutsche Gesellschaft für Ur- und Frühgeschichte (German Society for Pre- and Protohistory)

See also
 Archaeological association